Miconia superba is a species of plant in the family Melastomataceae. It is found in Guyana and Venezuela.

References

superba
Near threatened plants
Taxonomy articles created by Polbot